St. Charles is a village in Saginaw County in the U.S. state of Michigan. The village is located in the northwest corner of St. Charles Township with portions of the village located within Brant and Swan Creek townships. The population was 2,054 at the 2010 census.

Geography
The Bad River flows through St. Charles.

Demographics

The median income for a household in the village was $50,183.

2010 census
As of the census of 2010, there were 2,054 people, 864 households, and 550 families living in the village. The racial makeup of the village was 97.0% White, 0.9% African American, 0.7% Native American, 0.1% Asian, 0.2% from other races, and 1.1% from two or more races. Hispanic or Latino of any race were 5.2% of the population.

There were 864 households, of which 30.6% had children under the age of 18 living with them, 43.4% were married couples living together, 14.9% had a female householder with no husband present, 5.3% had a male householder with no wife present, and 36.3% were non-families. 30.6% of all households were made up of individuals, and 14.5% had someone living alone who was 65 years of age or older. The average household size was 2.36 and the average family size was 2.93.

The median age in the village was 38.7 years. 24.1% of residents were under the age of 18; 9.3% were between the ages of 18 and 24; 23.9% were from 25 to 44; 26.7% were from 45 to 64; and 16.1% were 65 years of age or older. The gender makeup of the village was 48.4% male and 51.6% female.

2000 census
As of the census of 2000, there were 2,215 people, 865 households, and 615 families living in the village. The racial makeup of the village was 96.57% White, 0.68% African American, 0.63% Native American, 0.14% Asian, 0.99% from other races, and 0.99% from two or more races. Hispanic or Latino of any race were 3.34% of the population.

There were 865 households, out of which 34.2% had children under the age of 18 living with them, 53.2% were married couples living together, 13.6% had a female householder with no husband present, and 28.9% were non-families. 25.1% of all households were made up of individuals, and 11.3% had someone living alone who was 65 years of age or older.  The average household size was 2.55 and the average family size was 3.03.

In the village, the population was spread out, with 27.2% under the age of 18, 8.8% from 18 to 24, 27.9% from 25 to 44, 21.8% from 45 to 64, and 14.3% who were 65 years of age or older.  The median age was 36 years. For every 100 females, there were 93.6 males.  For every 100 females age 18 and over, there were 88.9 males.

Climate
This climatic region is typified by large seasonal temperature differences, with warm to hot (and often humid) summers and cold (sometimes severely cold) winters.  According to the Köppen Climate Classification system, St. Charles has a humid continental climate, abbreviated "Dfb" on climate maps.

References

External links
Village of St. Charles

Villages in Saginaw County, Michigan
Villages in Michigan